Fabio Valeriano Lanfranco De Masi (born 7 March 1980) is a German-Italian politician. He was a member of the German Bundestag from 2017 to 2021 and was a member of the European Parliament (MEP) from Germany from 1 July 2014 to 23 October 2017. Until September 2022 he was a member of The Left Party, part of the European United Left–Nordic Green Left.

Political career

Member of the European Parliament, 2014–2017
In the 2014 European elections, De Masi became a Member of the European Parliament. During his time in office, he served on the Committee on Economic and Monetary Affairs and the Special Committee on Tax Rulings and Other Measures Similar in Nature or Effect (TAXE 2). In addition to his committee assignments, he was part of the Parliament's delegation for relations with South Africa.

Member of the German Parliament, 2017–2021
De Masi was a member of the German Bundestag since the 2017 elections, representing Hamburg. In parliament, he was serving on the Finance Committee. In addition to his committee assignments, he was part of the German-British Parliamentary Friendship Group, the German-Italian Parliamentary Friendship Group, and the Parliamentary Friendship Group for Relations with the Southern African States. Since 2019, he was also a member of the German delegation to the Franco-German Parliamentary Assembly. In March 2021 De Masi said that he will not run for the Bundestag in the 2021 German federal election.

On 13 September 2022, De Masi announced that he left The Left Party, stating that he would not want anymore to be taken into responsibility for the blatant failure of the relevant actors in this party.“

Other activities
 Berliner Steuergespräche, Member of the Adivsory Board
 Finance Watch, Member
 FC St. Pauli, Member
 German United Services Trade Union (ver.di), Member

References

1980 births
Living people
People from Groß-Gerau
German people of Italian descent
Members of the Bundestag for Hamburg
Aufstehen
The Left (Germany) MEPs
MEPs for Germany 2014–2019
Members of the Bundestag 2017–2021
Members of the Bundestag for The Left